is a Japanese footballer who plays for Iwate Grulla Morioka in J2 League.

Club statistics
Updated to 2 January 2022.

References

External links
Profile at Renofa Yamaguchi
Profile at Yokohama F. Marinos 

1997 births
Living people
Association football people from Kanagawa Prefecture
Japanese footballers
J1 League players
J2 League players
J3 League players
Yokohama F. Marinos players
Renofa Yamaguchi FC players
Blaublitz Akita players
SC Sagamihara players
Association football forwards